Makheka is a community council located in the Maseru District of Lesotho. Its population in 2006 was 5,473.

References

Populated places in Maseru District